Fashions in Love is a 1929 American Pre-Code comedy film adapted by Melville Baker, Richard H. Digges Jr., and Louise Long from the play, "The Concert" by Hermann Bahr. It was directed by Victor Schertzinger and stars Adolphe Menjou, Fay Compton, Miriam Seegar, John Miljan, and Joan Standing. The film was released on June 29, 1929, by Paramount Pictures.

Plot
A concert pianist, the romantic idol of many women, is seduced away from his wife. The seductress's husband takes in the pianist's wife, and all four pretend to be happy with the new arrangement.

Cast
Adolphe Menjou as Paul de Remy
Fay Compton as Marie De Remy
Miriam Seegar as Delphine Martin
John Miljan as Frank Martin
Joan Standing as Miss Weller
Russ Powell as Joe
Billie Bennett as Jane

References

External links
 

1929 films
1920s English-language films
Silent American comedy films
1929 comedy films
Paramount Pictures films
Films directed by Victor Schertzinger
American black-and-white films
1920s American films